is a 2011 Japanese historical drama television series and the 50th NHK taiga drama. It was written for television by Kumiko Tabuchi, based on her own novel of the same name. The drama stars Juri Ueno in the title role, with Rie Miyazawa and Asami Mizukawa as Cha-cha and Hatsu respectively, the sisters of Gō.

The series was criticized by viewers for being "dark" and "boring", and it received two Shinchō Razzie Awards for Worst TV Series and Worst Actress (Juri Ueno).

Plot
At the center of a network of powerful warriors, the title character is Oeyo, also known as Ogō. The series carries the subtitle Himetachi no Sengoku, spotlighting the ladies of the Sengoku period. Gō was a daughter of Oichi, the sister of Oda Nobunaga. Oichi was the wife of Sengoku daimyō Azai Nagamasa. The couple had three daughters. The first, Yodo-dono, became the second wife of Toyotomi Hideyoshi and mother of his successor Hideyori. The second, Ohatsu, married another Sengoku daimyo, Kyōgoku Takatsugu.

The third daughter was Gō. She was the first wife of Saji Kazunari. However, he joined forces with Tokugawa Ieyasu in the Battle of Komaki and Nagakute, and opponent Toyotomi Hideyoshi forced them to divorce. Her second husband, Toyotomi Hidekatsu, was a nephew of Hideyoshi, but died in the Japanese invasions of Korea. Finally, Gō married Tokugawa Hidetada, the second Tokugawa shogun, and gave birth to his successor Iemitsu as well as his brother Tadanaga. Her two daughters were Senhime, who married Hideyori, and Masako (Kazuko), consort of Emperor Go-Mizunoo. Moreover, her granddaughter ascended the throne as Empress Meishō.

Cast

Principal
Juri Ueno as Gō, youngest daughter of Azai Nagamasa, mother of Iemitsu
Rie Miyazawa as Cha-cha, oldest daughter of Azai Nagamasa
Asami Mizukawa as Hatsu, older sister of Gō

Azai Family
Mana Ashida as young Cha-cha
Honami Suzuki as Ichi, mother of Gō
Saburō Tokitō as Azai Nagamasa, father of Gō
Minori Terada as Azai Hisamasa, father of Azai Nagamasa, grandfather of Go
Masayuki Yui as Akao Kiyotsuna

Oda Family
Etsushi Toyokawa as Oda Nobunaga, brother of Ichi, uncle of Gō
Ayumi Tanida as Oda Nobutada, eldest son of Oda Nobunaga
Yūta Yamazaki as Oda Nobukatsu, second son of Oda Nobunaga
Yūta Kanai as Oda Nobutaka, third son of Oda Nobunaga
Takashi Kobayashi as Oda Nobukane, uncle of Gō

Vassal of Oda Family
Yasuo Daichi as Shibata Katsuie
Keisaku Wada as Maeda Toshiie
Shun Ōide as Old Toshiie
Takehiro Hira as Saji Kazunari, cousin of three sisters
Yoshiharu Takeda as Ikeda Tsuneoki
Jundai Yamada as Sakuma Morimasa
Kōji Seto as Mori Ranmaru
Shōta Sometani as Mori Bōmaru
Shōgo Sakamoto as Mori Rikimaru

Akechi Family
Masachika Ichimura as Akechi Mitsuhide, a general under Oda Nobunaga
Mimura as Hosokawa Gracia, a daughter of Akechi Mitsuhide
Yū Kamio as Saitō Toshimitsu

Toyotomi Family
Gorō Kishitani as Toyotomi Hideyoshi, vassal of Oda Nobunaga
Shinobu Otake as One, legal wife of Toyotomi Hideyoshi
Tomoko Naraoka as Naka, mother of Toyotomi Hideyoshi
Yukiya Kitamura as Toyotomi Hidetsugu, a nephew and retainer of Toyotomi Hideyoshi
Yoshihiko Hakamada as Hashiba Hidenaga, Toyotomi Hidenaga
Taiga as Toyotomi Hideyori
Shiori Kutsuna as Senhime
Sawa Suzuki as Kyōgoku Tatsuko

Vassal of Toyotomi Family
Masato Hagiwara as Ishida Mitsunari
Toshio Shiba as Kuroda Kanbei
Shinji Takeda as Ōno Harunaga

Tokugawa Family
Kin'ya Kitaōji as Tokugawa Ieyasu, father of Tokugawa Hidetada
Osamu Mukai as Tokugawa Hidetada, third son of Tokugawa Ieyasu
Kayo Asano as Lady Tsukiyama
Shōgo Kimura as Tokugawa Nobuyasu, eldest son of Tokugawa Ieyasu
Yasuko Tomita as Fuku
Naoto Kinosaki as Takechiyo
Tomoyuki Imagawa as Kunimatsu
Kaito Kobayashi as Hoshina Kōmatsu
Mone Kamishiraishi as Masa

Vassal of Tokugawa Family
Masao Kusakari as Honda Masanobu
Shunsuke Kariya as Honda Tadakatsu
Ken'ichi Sakuragi as Sakai Tadatsugu

Others
Motoya Izumi as Ashikaga Yoshiaki, the 15th shogun of the Ashikaga shogunate
Jin Nakayama as Asakura Yoshikage
Kōji Ishizaka as Sen no Rikyū, famous tea masters
Manabu Hamada as Sanada Yukimura
Tatsumi Fujinami as Sanada Masayuki
Takumi Saito as Kyōgoku Takatsugu
Akira Hamada as Mōri Terumoto
Koji Shimizu as Hōjō Ujimasa
Nobuyoshi Hisamatsu as Takeda Katsuyori

Production
Gō was announced as the 50th taiga drama by the NHK on June 17, 2009, to be based on the novel of the same name by Kumiko Tabuchi, who is also the writer for the drama. Tabuchi, composer Ryō Yoshimata, and actress Tomoko Naraoka all previously worked on the 47th taiga drama Atsuhime in 2008. With the success of Atsuhime, Tabuchi was asked in the middle of its run if she can write a series about Gō and her sisters, to which she agreed to. Though she began to write the teleplays for Gō in 2008, she would decide to complete the novel first before continuing to write the scripts.

The usual taiga drama production would first have one-third of the expected number of scripts finished before shooting begins. Afterwards, audience reception is taken into account as the rest of the series is written.

Production credits
Sword fight arranger - Kunishirō Hayashi

Episode list
The first and last episodes are 73 minutes long. The rest are 45 minutes long without commercials.

Reception
Though Gō was rigorous in trying to achieve an accurate depiction of Japanese history, it was reported to have been negatively received by viewers, who complained about the series being "dark" and "boring".

Soundtrack
NHK Taiga Drama Gō: Hime-tachi no Sengoku, Original Soundtrack (February 16, 2010)

Bibliography
Official guide
NHK Taiga Drama Story Gō First Volume  (December 18, 2010)
NHK Taiga Drama Story Gō Latter Volume  (May 29, 2011)
NHK Taiga Drama, Historical Handbook, Gō  (December 21, 2010)
Novel
Gō First Volume  (October 31, 2009)
Gō Last Volume  (January 29, 2010)
Gō, New Edition, First Volume  (November 12, 2010)
Gō, New Edition, Latter Volume  (November 12, 2010)
Gō, New Edition, Last Volume  (November 12, 2010)
Comic
Gō 1  (December 20, 2010)
Gō 2  (April 13, 2011)

Accolades

References

External links

 NHK website
 2011 NHK Taiga drama exhibitions "Gō"

< Ryōmaden | Taiga drama | Taira no Kiyomori >

Taiga drama
2011 Japanese television series debuts
2011 Japanese television series endings
Jidaigeki
Television series about sisters
Television series set in the 16th century
Television series set in the 17th century
Cultural depictions of Akechi Mitsuhide
Cultural depictions of Oda Nobunaga
Cultural depictions of Sanada clan
Cultural depictions of Toyotomi Hideyoshi
Cultural depictions of Tokugawa Ieyasu
Television shows set in Osaka
Television shows set in Shiga Prefecture